Coral Harbour Airport  is located  northwest of Coral Harbour, Nunavut, Canada, and is operated by the government of Nunavut.It has a GRVL runway 5006 x 100 feet.

Airlines and destinations

References

External links
Page about this airport on COPA's Places to Fly airport directory

Certified airports in the Kivalliq Region
Airfields of the United States Army Air Forces Air Transport Command in North America
Airfields of the United States Army Air Forces in Canada